Renchuan is a town in  south-central Zhejiang province, China. It is under the administration and is in the south of Pan'an County. , it has 28 villages under its administration.

References 

Township-level divisions of Zhejiang
Pan'an County